Rodon or Rodón may refer to:

People
 Carlos Rodón (born 1992), American professional baseball pitcher
 Chris Rodon, Welsh former professional footballer
 Dolors Vives Rodon (1909–2007), Spanish aviator
 Francisco Rodón (born 1934), Puerto Rican painter
 Joe Rodon (born 1997), Welsh professional footballer
 Miriam Rodón Naveira (born 1963), Puerto Rican environmental scientist
 Montserrat Cervera Rodon (born 1949), Catalan anti-militarist, feminist, and women's health activist
 Peter Rodon (died 2000), Welsh professional footballer
 Ramón Balcells Rodón (1919–1999), Spanish sailor

Places
 Cape of Rodon, in Albania
 Castle of Rodon, in Albania
 Rodon, old name of Jämtland, Sweden
 Rodon (Athens), former music venue in Athens, Greece

See also
 Radon
 Rodan
 Rodin (surname)
 Rondon (disambiguation)